Ategumia dilecticolor is a moth in the family Crambidae. It was described by Harrison Gray Dyar Jr. in 1912. It is found in Mexico (Veracruz), Guatemala and Honduras.

References

Moths described in 1912
Spilomelinae
Moths of Central America